Julius Schmidt (26 February 1872 – 29 March 1933) was a German chemist.

Career

Schmidt studied chemistry at the University of Jena, where he was a student of Ludwig Knorr. In 1900 he became an associate professor in organic chemistry at the University of Stuttgart. His research focused on nitroso compounds, oximes and quinones and derivatives of phenanthrene and fluorene. In addition, Schmidt was director of the chemistry laboratory at the higher mechanical engineering school in Esslingen.

Schmidt published numerous works on alkaloids, pyrazoles and organic magnesium compounds. In addition to textbooks, he published a handbook of organic chemistry and a yearbook of organic chemistry.

He was the father of the biochemist Gerhard Schmidt.

References

20th-century German chemists
University of Jena alumni
Academic staff of the University of Stuttgart
1872 births
1933 deaths